Bogy Township is a township in Jefferson County, in the U.S. state of Arkansas. The township was established in 1854. Its population was 54 as of the 2020 census.

References

1854 establishments in Arkansas
Arkansas populated places on the Arkansas River
Populated places established in 1854
Townships in Jefferson County, Arkansas